Flat Top Mountain is a 1,736-foot (529 m) mountain located on Chichagof Island in the City and Borough of Sitka in the U.S. state of Alaska.

Mountains of Alaska
Mountains of Sitka, Alaska